Lithotrya is a genus of crustaceans belonging to the monotypic family Lithotryidae.

The species of this genus are found in Southern Hemisphere.

Species:

Lithotrya dorsalis 
Lithotrya nicobarica 
Lithotrya rhodiopus 
Lithotrya valentiana

References

Barnacles
Maxillopoda genera